North Colchester was a Borough Constituency in Essex, represented in the House of Commons of the Parliament of the United Kingdom from 1983 until 1997. It elected one Member of Parliament (MP) by the first past the post system of election.

History 
This seat was created for the 1983 general election from parts of the abolished Colchester constituency and parts of the Harwich constituency. It was abolished at the next redistribution which came into effect for the 1997 general election, when Colchester was re-established as a borough constituency and a new county constituency of North Essex was created.

It was a safe Conservative seat throughout its existence.

Boundaries
The Borough of Colchester wards of Boxted and Langham, Castle, Copford and Eight Ash Green, Dedham, Fordham, Great and Little Horkesley, Great Tey, Highwoods Lexden, Marks Tey, Mile End, St Andrew's, St Anne's, St John's, St Mary's, Stanway, West Bergholt, and Wivenhoe, and the District of Tendring wards of Alresford Thorrington and Frating, Ardleigh, Brightlingsea East, Brightlingsea West, Elmstead, Great Bentley, Great Bromley Little Bromley and Little Bentley, Lawford and Manningtree, and Mistley.

The seat was created in 1983 by dividing the Colchester constituency. It took in the northern parts of the town of Colchester, including the town centre, plus the rural areas to the north of Colchester, and south of either the Stour estuary or the Suffolk border. It also included western parts of the Harwich constituency, including Wivenhoe and Brightlingsea.

The seat was abolished in 1997, with the parts of the town being included in the re-established constituency of Colchester and remaining areas being included in the new constituency of North Essex, a seat surrounding Colchester.

Members of Parliament

Elections

Elections in the 1980s 

Changes in vote share for 1983 is based on change from 1979 result of Colchester.

Elections in the 1990s

See also 
List of parliamentary constituencies in Essex

Notes and references 

Parliamentary constituencies in Essex (historic)
Constituencies of the Parliament of the United Kingdom established in 1983
Constituencies of the Parliament of the United Kingdom disestablished in 1997
Politics of Colchester